Killarney Heights High School is a coeducational, comprehensive high school located on Starkey Street in Killarney Heights, a northern suburb of Sydney, near the Northern Beaches, Australia.

Academically, Killarney Heights High School has performed better in 2018 and 2019 than previously, ranking in the top 100 schools both years, for the first time.

History

The school was established in January 1967 to serve the new suburb of Killarney Heights which was built in the early 1960s. Some construction was still ongoing when the school opened and by the end of the year there were eight classrooms over four buildings. There were extensions to the school in 1968 and 1969. When the school opened there were 137 students but this rose rapidly with 998 students being enrolled by 1971 and 1281 by 1972.

In 1972, the school was vandalised when the library was deliberately flooded.

A gala event was held in 2017 to mark the 50th anniversary of the school.

Motto

The motto comes from an abbreviated quote from the writings of a late Old English abbot and Aelfric of Eynsham "a prolific writer of religious literature, including translations from the Bible, saints' lives and homilies. It reads as follows: Ic afandie manna heotan: & heora lendena. & aelcum sylle aefter his faerelde.& aefter his agenre afundennysse. This means: 'to each I will give according to his {life} journey and according to his own invention [or discovery]'".

The school motto "sylle aefter faerelde" was translated as "To each according to his/her conduct" (translated as his/her due to the school being coeducational). The three words on their own can also be interpreted as "sylle" – foundation, "aefter" – after, "faerelde " — journey.

Academic results

Notable alumni and staff 
Ben Gathercole, triathlon coach
Julie Sutton, former mayor of Warringah

See also 
List of Government schools in New South Wales
Forestville, New South Wales

External links 
School web site

References

Public high schools in Sydney
Educational institutions established in 1967
1967 establishments in Australia